Dolapo Olaoye (born 17 October 1982) is a Nigerian former footballer. He played in the Football League for Port Vale, and also played Conference football for Stafford Rangers.

Career
Olaoye joined Port Vale in August 2000, making his debut on 19 August as a late substitute for Tony Naylor in Vale's 3–0 win at home to Oxford United. However, this was his only appearance in the Vale first team before being released.

He subsequently moved to the United States where he attended Mercer University and played for Michigan Bucks. He scored 31 goals in four years with the Bucks, being named as Freshman of the Year in 2002, on the First Team All-Conference in 2002 and 2004, on the Second Team All-Conference in 2003 and 2005, and the All-Tournament Team in 2005. He returned to Port Vale as a triallist in July 2005, scoring in their 4–1 friendly win against Northwich Victoria.

He joined Stafford Rangers in August 2006, but struggled with injuries and was released at the end of the 2007–08 season after Stafford's relegation to the Conference North. He joined Redditch United , but was loaned to Rugby Town prior to the start of the 2008–09 season, returning to Redditch in August 2008.

Career statistics
Source:

References

1982 births
Living people
Yoruba sportspeople
Association football forwards
Sportspeople from Lagos
Nigerian footballers
Port Vale F.C. players
Mercer Bears men's soccer players
Flint City Bucks players
Stafford Rangers F.C. players
Redditch United F.C. players
Rugby Town F.C. players
English Football League players
USL League Two players
Nigerian expatriate sportspeople in the United States
Nigerian emigrants to the United Kingdom